Alfred de Montesquiou (born 1978) is a contemporary French reporter, author and documentary film director. He is a laureate of France's highest journalism prize, the Prix Albert Londres.

Biography 
Born in 1978 in Paris, Alfred de Montesquiou is a graduate in international relations from Sciences Po, and in journalism from the Columbia Journalism School in New York. He was a foreign correspondent and war correspondent for the Associated Press news agency from 2004 till 2010 first in Haiti then in the Middle-East, Afghanistan and North Africa. In 2010, he became a senior international correspondent for the French magazine Paris Match, and was awarded the 2012 Albert Londres prize for his coverage of the civil war in Libya. In 2013 he received the Interallie Nouveau Cercle literary prize for his essay on the Middle-East "Oumma". In 2015 he was the laureate of the French Press Editors' Association for his investigative work on the crash of the MH17 flight in the Ukraine. 

As a documentary director and author, he has travelled across Asia along the Silk Road in the footsteps of Marco Polo for a 15 episode series for ARTE, and Amazon Prime. 
He conducted a 5 part series across South America, also for Arte. 
He has directed several prime time documentaries for French public TV channels France 2 and France 5 on subjects ranging from terrorism investigations to ecology. 
 
He runs the film production company Dreamtime Films.

Alfred is a member of the Montesquiou family, and as the eldest son of Jean de Montesquiou d’Artagnan is heir apparent to the count d’Artagnan title, stemming from the marshal d’Artagnan.

Bibliography & Films 

Films : 
 "South America: on the road of extremes," 2019, ARTE, 5 hour documentary series (author) 
 "Animals against terrorism," : Sniffer dogs, de-mining rats, eagles trained against drones etc., France TV, 2018, 1 hour documentary (director) 
 "Pere Hamel", France TV, 2018, 1 hour investigative documentary (director) 
 "On The Silk Road" from Venice to Xi'an in the steps of Marco Polo, 2017, ARTE, 8 hour documentary series (author). 
 "Gorilla War", Congo, France TV, 2015, 1 hour documentary (co-director) 

Books : 
 "La Route des Extrêmes", Paris 2019, Ed. Gallimard / Arte Editions 
 "Silk Road", Paris, 2017, Ed. Le Chêne/ Arte Editions
 OUMMA,  Ed. Seuil,  Paris, April 2013. Laureate of the Nouveau Cercle Interallie Literary Prize.
 In Amenas (with Marie-Pierre Gröndhal) e-book, Lagardère, Jan 2013
 He is also the co-author of the texts for the photography book recollecting the work of Remi Ochlik, killed in Syria in February 2012

References

External links 
  Paris Match
  20minutes.fr
  Fiche de l'auteur, seuil.com
  Rédacteur d'AP

See also 
 Montesquiou family
 Albert-Londre prize

1978 births
Living people
French journalists
French male non-fiction writers